Hmisho Trading Group is a group of companies involved in heavy metal industries, international trade, car marketing and rendering after sale services.

Subsidiaries
The group's subsidiary companies include Hmisho Steel S.A (who manufacturing rolled steel bars for construction), Hmisho Trading Company (car importation) and Gulf company (after sale services).

Hmisho Steel S.A
Hmisho Steel S.A operates a Roll mill plant for manufacturing deformed reinforced iron bars for buildings, long iron bars and wire coils. They have a production capacity of 500,000 a year.

The plant was built with the aid of the European Union. The products they make are marketed in Syria, Iraq, Europe and the Persian Gulf.

Hmisho Trading Company

Hmisho Trading Company is the exclusive distributor for international car manufacturing companies Saipa Group, Kerman Motors, First Automobile Works,  Changhe Automobile Import and Export LTD and Eicher Motors. They are also involved in the passenger car assembly plant in Homs Governorate, along with the Iranian Saipa Corporation, under the name of Syrian-Iranian Vehicle company International (SIVECO). Through this partnership they manufacture around f 20000 cars a year.

Hmisho Trading imported approximately 25,000 cars annually from China and Iran, and were ranked first in the marketing and sale of cars in Syria in 2004, 2005 and 2006. They have 50 car carriers for use in the import and export of cars.

Gulf Company

Gulf Company is involved in after sale services and has a number of car maintenance and repair centers in Syria. They operate several warehouses for storage of spare parts and equipment for repairs and maintenance.

Company expansion
In 2007 Hmisho Trading Group announced that they were planning a new combined wire rod and bar mill for the production of low and medium carbon content rebars. It was scheduled to start production in 2007 with an estimated capacity of 300,000 tones per year.

References

Companies of Syria
Latakia